The Military Intelligence Agency (abbr. VOA) is the military intelligence agency of the Ministry of Defence of Serbia. The Military Intelligence Agency is an expert and governing body of the intelligence of the Ministry of Defence of Serbia and makes an integral part of the security system of the Republic of Serbia. It is tasked with and responsible for providing information, as well as representing and protecting the interests of the Republic of Serbia abroad. It carries out its tasks through activities pertaining to military intelligence and military diplomacy.

Its role is similar to that of the U.S. DIA or the UK DIS but its Director reports directly to the Minister of Defence.

Mission and objectives
The main mission is to provide intelligence support to the state government of the Republic of Serbia and Serbian Armed Forces as well as to their members home and abroad. The competences, the jurisdiction of work, responsibilities, tasks, relations, cooperation, are regulated by the Book of Regulations on Internal Organization and Work Position Systematization.

Agency motto is "Faster, better and wiser", and its staff and officers in their duties tend to be the first line of defence.

Basic objectives are preventing surprises and providing data on security situation in close and wider surroundings, with focus on detecting and monitoring forces and the intentions of a possible enemy, terrorist and extremist forces, as well as on collecting other data on activities in the army, economy and politics which could greatly influence the safety of the country.

Organisation
Operations: Operations Department is an organizational part of the Military Intelligence Agency competent for operations, planning, organization, coordination and management of the work of intelligence - reconnaissance organs on collecting information. 
Centers of MIA: Centres of the Military Intelligence Agency perform the tasks from the field of intelligence and reconnaissance activity by providing continuous, timely and safe data gathering and by monitoring military and security situation in immediate and wide surroundings.

Analysis: The organizational unit of the MIA in charge of processing collected information, including the production of informative and analytical materials on:
-global and regional occurrences and processes,
-intentions and activities of performers of military and non-military jeopardizing the security of the country from abroad and
-the situation in areas of multinational operations in which members of the MoD and the SAF are engaged.
Situation center

Support: Support Department is tasked with personnel, financial, technical and logistics support necessary for the effective execution of all the functions and tasks of the Military Intelligence Agency. The Department plans, organizes and coordinates the activities from the field of human, material and financial resources management. It is also tasked with planning the intelligence education and training of MIA's members for the needs of the Military Intelligence Agency and defense system.
Intelligence training center (ITC)
Technical support center (TSC)

Cooperation: Cooperation section is tasked with planning, organization and realization of cooperation with foreign intelligence and security services, international organizations, related services and state institutions of the Republic of Serbia. The group organizes and realizes protocol obligations for director of the MIA.

Planning: Planning Section, an organizational part within MIA, is responsible for drawing up annual, monthly and periodic work schedules, extraordinary and regular reports as well as the other documents in this field. It also coordinates the work of organizational parts of MIA with the aim of dividing and grouping their tasks according to the principle of similarity and functional connections.

Internal control: This Section is an organizational part of the MIA competent for the internal control and performs duties related to: control of the legality of work and application of the powers of the agency's members, oversight of the objectives of work, control of the realization of planned activities, examination of origin, causes and consequences of some extraordinary events and cooperation with the government authorities on the matters from the scope of work.

Security: Security is an organizational section of MIA competent for the security protection of the Agency’s personnel, facilities and documents.

Defence attache offices: Defense Attache Offices carry out the diplomatic function in the field of defense and are responsible for representing and protecting the interests of the Ministry of Defense of the Republic of Serbia and Serbian Armed Forces abroad.

Defense Attache Offices perform their tasks in accordance with laws and Vienna Convention on Diplomatic Relations..

Currently, there are 21 Defense Attache Offices. In four countries, DAO is composed of a Defense Attache and a Defense Attache Assistant(The United States, United Kingdom, Germany and Russia). The other DAOs are represented by a Defense Attache (neighbours - Croatia, Hungary, Romania, Bulgaria, FYR Macedonia, Bosnia and Herzegovina; European countries - France, Italy, Austria, Greece, Belgium, Turkey and Spain; Asia - China and Israel; Аfrica - Egypt and Algeria). Another four countries are covered on the principle of non-residential accreditation. (Canada, Norway, Slovakia and Slovenia).

In the forthcoming period a few more DAOs of the Republic of Serbia are planned to be opened in accordance with the needs and financial possibilities of our country.

History
By establishing General Staff, established by the General Staff Organization in 1876, the bearer of the military intelligence activities was the First, that is, the Operation Section. By the Order of the General Staff in 1884, the act defines that the External Sub Section of the Operation Section be the executive organ of the military intelligence service.

Later on, the competences of External Section were then extended and in 1900 it was also called Sub Section for Reporting, while in 1902 it was named Sub Section for Reporting of the Operation Section.

During World War I, when the General Staff was transformed into the Serbian Supreme Command HQ, the Sub Section for Reporting of the Operation Section became the Intelligence Subsection of the Supreme Command Operation Section, and it was usually treated as the Intelligence Sub Section of the Supreme Command.

On 10 April 1920, by the Order on General Staff and General Staff Profession (Official Gazette, no. 2411920) the General Staff was made up of: Operation Section, Intelligence Section, Traffic Section, History Section and Geographical Institute. Intelligence Section started to operate on 6 May 1920

Intelligence Section of the General Staff of Kingdom of Yugoslavia Armed Forces developed both in structure and function. Under the Yugoslav intelligence service or the “Jugoslovenska obaveštajna služba” (Југословенска обавештајна служба), they perform two basic functions: intelligence and counterintelligence while at the same time underlining the necessity of intensifying the psychological propaganda function. The number of sections and sub sections increased over time, so this subsection became General Staff Second Directorate with two intelligence sections and a number of intelligence centers.

By the order to form the Section for People’s Protection as of 13 May 1944 the security functions were definitively and officially separated from intelligence functions. The General Staff of the Yugoslav Army (JNA) had an Intelligence Section which in 1947 became into JNA GS Second Department, that is, the Department of Intelligence of JNA GS.

2002–present
After the dissolution of Security Administration, military counterintelligence agency of FR Yugoslavia, two separate agencies were established based on the decision on organizational and mobilization change. These two are: Military Intelligence Agency (VOA) and Military Security Agency (VBA). Military Intelligence Agency was officially established on 14 September 2004.

See also
 Military Security Agency (VBA)
 Security Intelligence Agency (BIA)
 Intelligence and Reconnaissance Directorate

References

External links
 Official website

1886 establishments in Serbia
Government agencies established in 1886
Serbian intelligence agencies
Military intelligence agencies
Ministry of Defence (Serbia)